Sarsawa Airport, also known as Saharanpur Airport, is an upcoming civil enclave at the Indian Air Force's Sarsawa Air Force Station, in Saharanpur district in the state of Uttar Pradesh, India. The civil terminal of airport will be built at 20 km away from Saharanpur and 2.5 km away from Sarsawa .

Proposed destinations
Under Regional Connectivity Scheme UDAN, it is proposed to have direct flights to Lucknow, Prayagaraj, Gorakhpur, Varanasi, Kanpur, Kushinagar and Ayodhya.

References

Airports in Uttar Pradesh
Proposed airports in Uttar Pradesh
Transport in Saharanpur